Keith Berry (born October 25, 1987) is an American mixed martial artist who competed in Bellator's Middleweight division. A professional fighter since 2005, Berry has formerly fought for the WEC, Strikeforce, King of the Cage and Elite XC ShoXC. Berry is the former 2x King of the Cage Middleweight Champion.

Background
Berry is from Murrieta, California, and attended Murrieta Valley High School where he competed in wrestling. Despite having a quiet personality, Berry got into wrestling in high school and was introduced to boxing.
In 2020 Berry got engaged to adult film star Nicole Aniston.

Mixed martial arts career

Early career: World Extreme Cagefighting and King of the Cage
Berry started his career in 2005 for the California-based promotions King of the Cage and World Extreme Cagefighting. On his two bouts for WEC, he won against Donny Rider and lost against Terry Martin. For KOTC, he won five bouts and the middleweight title, remaining undefeated in the organization until his light heavyweight title fight against Tony Lopez, in which he lost via TKO in the third round due to his coach throwing in the towel against his request.

Gladiator Challenge
Between 2009 and 2010, Berry fought four times for Gladiator Challenge, obtaining four consecutive victories and holding two of the fastest KO in MMA history (5 and 6 seconds). Despite having lost against Brett Cooper at Pechanga Casino’s very first MMA event Lords of Chaos, in 2011 Berry signed with Strikeforce.

Strikeforce
Berry made his debut on June 24, 2011 on Strikeforce Challengers: Fodor vs. Terry against Trevor Smith. He lost via technical submission in the second round.

Berry faced Gian Villante on August 12, 2011 at Strikeforce Challengers: Gurgel vs. Duarte. He lost via unanimous decision.

Berry was expected to face Andreas Spång on November 18, 2012 at Strikeforce Challengers: Britt vs. Sayers. However, for undisclosed reasons he was forced out of the bout and was replaced by Willie Parks.

Berry faced Adlan Amagov on April 14, 2012 at Strikeforce: Rousey vs. Kaufman. He lost via TKO in the first round. The ruling was controversial as Amagov seemed to throw a linear kick to the knee of Berry an illegal strike under the Unified Rules of MMA. The kick caused Berry to fall down. Berry then began verbally protesting to the referee Herb Dean, who interpreted this as Berry requesting to stop the fight. Many fighters, including 2 time PRIDE FC Champion Dan Henderson posted on social media saying this was Herb Deans “worst stoppage ever”.

After two victories on Xplode Fight Series, Berry signed with Bellator.

Bellator
Berry made his debut on March 7, 2013 at Bellator 92 against Richard Rigmaden. He won via submission in the first round.

Berry faced Cortez Coleman on June 19, 2013 at Bellator 96. He won via split decision (28-29, 29-28, 29-28).

Berry faced Jeremy Kimball on July 31, 2013 at Bellator 97. He was knocked out in the 2nd round of the bout.

Berry faced Eugene Fadiora on October 25, 2013 at Bellator 105. He lost via TKO in the second round.

Berry then faced Dave Vitkay on April 11, 2014 at Bellator 116. Berry lost the bout via unanimous decision.

Berry was released from the promotion on June 25, 2014.

Despite being released in June 2014, Berry returned to face Joe Pacheco on October 3, 2014 at Bellator 127. He initially won the fight by split decision. However, Berry failed his post-fight drug test (Marijuana metabolites) and the California commission changed the result to a No Contest.

Championships and accomplishments

Mixed martial arts
King of the Cage
KOTC Middleweight Championship (One time)
One successful title defense
Xplode Fight Series
XFS Middleweight Championship (One time)

Mixed martial arts record

|-
| Win
| align=center| 17–15–1 (1)
| Jayce Bowman
| TKO (punches)
| Gladiator Challenge: Holiday Beatings
| 
| align=center| 2
| align=center| 0:50
| San Jacinto, California, United States
| 
|-
| Win
| align=center| 16–15–1 (1)
| Justin Baesman
| TKO (punches)
| Gladiator Challenge: Berry vs. Baesman
| 
| align=center| 1
| align=center| 1:31
| San Jacinto, California, United States
| 
|-
| Loss
| align=center| 15–15–1 (1)
| Joe Schilling
| Decision (unanimous)
| Bellator 219
| 
| align=center| 3
| align=center| 5:00
| Temecula, California, United States
| 
|-
| Loss
| align=center| 15–14–1 (1)
| Joseph Henle
| Submission (rear-naked choke)
| Golden Boy MMA: Liddell vs. Ortiz 3
| 
| align=center| 1
| align=center| 1:12
| Inglewood, California, United States
| 
|-
| Draw
| align=center| 15–13–1 (1)
| Kevin Casey
| Draw (majority)
| Bellator 170
| 
| align=center| 3
| align=center| 5:00
| Inglewood, California, United States
| 
|-
| NC
| align=center| 15–13 (1)
| Joe Pacheco
| No Contest
| Bellator 127
| 
| align=center| 3
| align=center| 5:00
| Temecula, California, United States
| Originally a split decision win for Berry; overturned after failing a drug test.
|-
| Loss
| align=center| 15–13
| Dave Vitkay
| Decision (unanimous)
| Bellator 116
| 
| align=center| 3
| align=center| 5:00
| Temecula, California, United States
| 
|-
| Loss
| align=center| 15–12
| Eugene Fadiora
| TKO (punches)
| Bellator 105
| 
| align=center| 2
| align=center| 4:19
| Rio Rancho, New Mexico, United States
| 
|-
| Loss
| align=center| 15–11
| Jeremy Kimball
| KO (punches)
| Bellator 97
| 
| align=center| 2
| align=center| 1:45
| Rio Rancho, New Mexico
| Catchweight (190 lbs) bout.
|-
| Win
| align=center| 15–10
| Cortez Coleman
| Decision (split)
| Bellator 96
| 
| align=center| 3
| align=center| 5:00
| Thackerville, Oklahoma
| Catchweight (186.4 lbs) bout; Berry missed weight.
|-
| Win
| align=center| 14–10
| Richard Rigmaden
| Submission (kimura)
| Bellator 92
| 
| align=center| 1
| align=center| 1:31
| Temecula, California
| 
|-
| Win
| align=center| 13–10
| Edward Darby
| TKO (punches)
| Xplode Fight Series: Vengeance
| 
| align=center| 1
| align=center| 1:02
| Valley Center, California
| 
|-
| Win
| align=center| 12–10
| Josh Gibson
| TKO (punches)
| Xplode Fight Series: Anarchy
| 
| align=center| 1
| align=center| 1:05
| Valley Center, California
| Won the XFS Middleweight Championship.
|-
| Loss
| align=center| 11–10
| Adlan Amagov
| TKO (leg kick and punches)
| Strikeforce: Rousey vs. Kaufman
| 
| align=center| 1
| align=center| 0:48
| San Diego, California
| 
|-
| Loss
| align=center| 11–9
| Tyson Jeffries
| Submission (rear-naked choke)
| FCOC: Fight Club OC
| 
| align=center| 1
| align=center| 4:10
| Costa Mesa, California
| 
|-
| Win
| align=center| 11–8
| Kenny Aires
| DQ
| Gladiator Challenge: Season's Beatings 3
| 
| align=center| 1
| align=center| N/A
| San Jacinto, California
| 
|-
| Loss
| align=center| 10–8
| Gian Villante
| Decision (unanimous)
| Strikeforce Challengers: Gurgel vs. Duarte
| 
| align=center| 3
| align=center| 5:00
| Las Vegas, Nevada, United States
|Light Heavyweight bout.
|-
| Loss
| align=center| 10–7
| Trevor Smith
| Technical submission (north-south choke)
| Strikeforce Challengers: Fodor vs. Terry
| 
| align=center| 2
| align=center| 3:02
| Kent, Washington, United States
|Light Heavyweight bout.
|-
| Loss
| align=center| 10–6
| Brett Cooper
| KO (punches)
| LOTC: Lords of the Cage
| 
| align=center| 1
| align=center| 0:10
| Temecula, California, United States
| 
|-
| Win
| align=center| 10–5
| Brendan Ellison
| TKO (punches)
| Gladiator Challenge: Fahrenheit
| 
| align=center| 1
| align=center| 0:46
| San Jacinto, California
| 
|-
| Win
| align=center| 9–5
| Sam Salas
| KO (punch)
| Gladiator Challenge: Bad Behavior
| 
| align=center| 1
| align=center| 0:06
| San Jacinto, California
| 
|-
| Win
| align=center| 8–5
| Brian Campbell
| TKO (submission to punches)
| Gladiator Challenge: Vision Quest
| 
| align=center| 1
| align=center| 0:14
| San Jacinto, California, United States
| 
|-
| Win
| align=center| 7–5
| Jeff Avants
| TKO (punches)
| Gladiator Challenge: Never Quit
| 
| align=center| 1
| align=center| 0:25
| San Jacinto, California, United States
| 
|-
| Loss
| align=center| 6–5
| Doug Marshall
| KO (punches)
| PureCombat 10: Fearless
| 
| align=center| 1
| align=center| 4:41
| Tulare, California
| 
|-
| Loss
| align=center| 6–4
| Tony Lopez
| TKO (punches)
| KOTC: Immortal
| 
| align=center| 3
| align=center| 4:29
| San Jacinto, California, United States
| Light Heavyweight bout; for the King of the Cage Light Heavyweight Championship.
|-
| Loss
| align=center| 6–3
| Ray Lizama
| TKO (punches to the body)
| ShoXC: Hamman vs. Suganuma 2
| 
| align=center| 2
| align=center| 2:15
| Friant, California, United States
| 
|-
| Win
| align=center| 6–2
| Umar Luv
| TKO (submission to strikes)
| KOTC: Final Chapter
| 
| align=center| 2
| align=center| 4:50
| San Jacinto, California, United States
| Defended the King of the Cage Middleweight Championship.
|-
| Win
| align=center| 5–2
| Sean Loeffler
| Submission (triangle choke)
| KOTC: Collision Course
| 
| align=center| 1
| align=center| 2:05
| San Jacinto, California, United States
| Return to Middleweight; won the King of the Cage Middleweight Championship.
|-
| Win
| align=center| 4–2
| Adrian Perez
| KO (knee)
| KOTC: Sinister
| 
| align=center| 1
| align=center| 0:12
| San Jacinto, California, United States
| 
|-
| Loss
| align=center| 3–2
| Kawika Morton
| Decision (split)
| CCFC: Judgment Day
| 
| align=center| 3
| align=center| 5:00
| Santa Rosa, California, United States
| 
|-
| Loss
| align=center| 3–1
| Terry Martin
| TKO (punches)
| WEC 24: Full Force
| 
| align=center| 1
| align=center| 2:52
| Lemoore, California, United States
| 
|-
| Win
| align=center| 3–0
| Aiki Cavanaugh
| KO (punch)
| KOTC: Mangler
| 
| align=center| 1
| align=center| 0:06
| San Jacinto, California, United States
|Light Heavyweight debut.
|-
| Win
| align=center| 2–0
| Donny Rider
| TKO (punches)
| WEC 20: Cinco de Mayhem
| 
| align=center| 1
| align=center| 0:36
| Lemoore, California, United States
| 
|-
| Win
| align=center| 1–0
| Johnny Vasquez
| TKO (punches)
| KOTC 63: Final Conflict
| 
| align=center| 1
| align=center| N/A
| San Jacinto, California, United States
|

References

1987 births
Living people
People from Murrieta, California
American male mixed martial artists
Middleweight mixed martial artists
Light heavyweight mixed martial artists
Mixed martial artists utilizing boxing
Mixed martial artists utilizing wrestling
Sportspeople from Riverside County, California
Mixed martial artists from California